SET domain containing 5 is a protein that in humans is encoded by the SETD5 gene.

It is a member of the histone lysine methyltransferase family.
Overexpression of SETD5 is associated positively with progression of breast cancer.
Mutations in SETD5 are associated with a rare developmental disorder termed autosomal dominant mental retardation-23 (MRD23, MIM#615761). MRD23 is mainly characterized by variable congenital defects and dysmorphic facies. Clinical features include developmental delay, intellectual disability, chewing abnormalities, hypospadias, and cryptorchidism in males in association with craniofacial dysmorphisms.

Model organisms 

Model organisms have been used in the study of SETD5 function. A conditional knockout mouse line called Setd5tm1a(EUCOMM)Wtsi was generated at the Wellcome Trust Sanger Institute. Male and female animals underwent a standardized phenotypic screen to determine the effects of deletion. Additional screens performed:  - In-depth immunological phenotyping

References